Fabián Felipe Taborda Torres (born 19 September 1978) is a Colombian football manager.

Career
Taborda was the head coach of the Colombia women's national team at the 2015 FIFA Women's World Cup and 2016 Summer Olympics.

References

External links
 
 
 Fabián Taborda at Soccerdonna.de 

1978 births
Living people
People from Palmira, Valle del Cauca
Colombian football managers
Women's association football managers
Colombia women's national football team managers
2015 FIFA Women's World Cup managers
Sportspeople from Valle del Cauca Department
21st-century Colombian people